Brooktown High (working title: Brooktown High: Senior Year) is a dating sim video game for the PlayStation Portable. It was developed by Backbone Entertainment and published by Konami.

Gameplay
Being touted as "your chance to re-live your high school days," Brooktown High places the gamer in the shoes of either a male or female high school student. This character is customizable, to some extent - hair style and color, eye color, height and weight are editable. Questions at the beginning of the game categorize the player into one of the social cliques.

The player then gets to interact with the 20 other students at Brooktown, who have their own social circles and distinct personalities, in order to become part of the different cliques. There are four different cliques: Nerds, Jocks, Preps, and Rebels.

The main goal is to find a boyfriend or girlfriend, who can be taken on dates to various locations such the movies, the beach, and the mall. Players may be asked to perform favors in exchange for characters' phone numbers.

Various mini-games will be used to reach the goals mentioned above. Each game boosts some percentage of the player's clique points (for example, smarts points to get into the nerds clique and athletic points to get into the jocks clique).

Reception

The game received "mixed" reviews according to the review aggregation website Metacritic.

References

External links
 

2007 video games
Dating sims
High school-themed video games
Konami games
North America-exclusive video games
PlayStation Portable games
PlayStation Portable-only games
Video games developed in Canada
Video games featuring protagonists of selectable gender